HMS Northumberland was a 70-gun third-rate ship of the line of the Royal Navy, built by Francis Bayley of Bristol in 1677/79. She partook in the last great battle of the War of English Succession and the first battle of the War of Spanish Succession. She was lost in the Great Storm of November 1703.

She was named in honour of Charles II illegitimate son, George Fitzroy, his son with Barbara Palmer (Duchess of Cleveland). George Fitzroy was made the Duke of Northumberland in 1678. This was the first vessel to bear the name Northumberland in the English and Royal Navy.

HMS Northumberland was awarded the Battle Honours Barfleur 1692, and Vigo 1702.

Construction and Specifications
She was ordered in May 1677 to be built under contract by Francis Bayley of Bristol. Bayley died in March 1678 and his executor, Mr. Pope, completed the ship. She was launched in June 1679. Her builder’s measure tonnage was calculated as 1,041.

Her initial gun armament was in accordance with the 1677 Establishment with 72/60 guns consisting of twenty-six demi-cannons (54 cwt, 9.5 ft) on the lower deck (LD), twenty-six 12-pounder guns (32 cwt, 9 ft) on the upper deck (UD), ten sakers (16 cwt, 7 ft) on the quarterdeck (QD), and four sakers (16 cwt, 7 ft) on the foc’x’le (Fc), with four 3-pounder guns (5 cwt, 5 ft) on the poop deck or roundhouse (RH). By 1688 she would carry 70 guns as per the 1685 Establishment, but with demi-culverins in place of the 12-pounder guns.

Commissioned Service

Service from 1679 to 1699
HMS Northumberland was commissioned on 20 June 1679 under the command of Captain John Wetwang until 20 September 1679 for delivery to Chatham. With the outbreak of the War of English Succession, she was commissioned in September 1690 under the command of Captain Andrew Cotton. She fought in the Battle of Barfleur in Rear (Blue) Squadron, Van Division from 19 to 22 May 1692. Captain Cotton was killed on 13 June 1693. In 1693 she was under Captain Henry Botelar, who was killed in a duel on 21 September 1693. In 1694 she was under Captain David Lambert sailing with Russel’s Fleet in the English Channel then moved on to the Mediterranean in October. In 1695 she was under Captain John Benbow participating in Lord Berkeley’s operations. In August 1695 she was under Captain Baron Wyld. Captain Christopher Fogge was her commander sailing with Lord Berkeley’s Fleet. She would be rebuilt at Chatham in 1699/1702.

Rebuild at Chatham Dockyard 1699 to 1702
She was ordered rebuilt on 14 September 1699 at Chatham Dockyard under the guidance of Master Shipwright Robert Shortiss. She was completed/launched in 1702. Her builder’s measure tonnage was calculated as 1,096 tons.

Her armament was under the 1703 Establishment was listed as 70 guns wartime / 62 guns peacetime consisting of twenty-four/twenty-two 24-pounder guns of 9.5 feet in length on the lower deck, twenty-six/twenty-four demi-culverins of 9-foot length on the upper deck, twelve/ten 6-pounder guns of 8.5-foot length on the quarterdeck, and four/two 6-pounder guns of (2/2) 9-foot length and (2/0) of 7.5-foot length, with four 5.5 foot 3-pounder guns on the poop deck or roundhouse. She may have carried her demi-cannons on the lower deck.

Service from 1702 to 1703
HMS Northumberland was commissioned in 1702 under the command of Captain James Greenaway for service with Sir George Rooke’s Fleet for operations at Cadiz, Spain. The fleet sailed from Spithead on 19 July for St Helens Island in the Scillies. The arrived in the Bay of Bulls, north of Cadiz on the 12th of August.  After the capture of Rota, Spain they destroyed the stores and departed for England on the 19th. After being informed of a French Fleet and Spanish treasure ships at Vigo Bay they sailed for the north-west coast of Spain. She was chosen for the attack on Vigo Bay and the harbour of Redondela on the 11th. Rear-Admiral John Graydon hoisted his flag, and she led the Blue Squadron in the attacked on the 12th. After about 90 minutes all enemy ships were either taken or destroyed. The Fleet had returned to the Downs by November 1702. She remained in Home Waters during 1703 cruising the English Channel.

Loss
During the Great Storm, she was lost on the Goodwin Sands during the night of 26/27 November 1703. Captain James Greenaway perished with his ship  along with her entire crew of 220 personnel. The wreck is a Protected Wreck managed by Historic England.

Wreck
The remains of the Northumberland lie south of three wrecks of other ships lost in the same storm - the Stirling Castle, Restoration and Mary. The Northumberland and Mary (the latter misidentified as the Restoration) were found by recreational divers in 1980. The site was designated under the Protection of Wrecks Act 1973 the following year. The current designation is under Statutory Instrument 2004/2395, of a  radius around 51° 15.4802’ N 01° 30.0161’ E.

The Archaeological Diving Unit (ADU) conducted a number of dives on the site over the next three decades and since 1999 technology has been applied in the form of magnetometer and side-scan sonar surveys. The wreck was originally identified by the discovery of a bell and stock with the naval broad arrow and date; subsequently the ADU have found guns, two copper cauldrons and an anchor. A dense turf of juvenile mussels covers most features, making it hard to identify them. There is a coherent piece of ship's structure just south of the centre of the designated area, with large timbers and some exposed planking, possibly corresponding to the region between the first and second futtocks (ribs) of the vessel.

Citations

References

 Colledge (2020), Ships of the Royal Navy, by J.J. Colledge, revised and updated by Lt Cdr Ben Warlow and Steve Bush, published by Seaforth Publishing, Barnsley, Great Britain, © 2020,  (EPUB), Section N (Northumberland)
 Winfield (2009), British Warships in the Age of Sail (1603 – 1714), by Rif Winfield, published by Seaforth Publishing, England © 2009, EPUB 
 Lavery, Brian (2003) The Ship of the Line - Volume 1: The Development of the Battlefleet 1650-1850. Conway Maritime Press. 
 Clowes (1898), The Royal Navy, A History from the Earliest Times to the Present (Vol. II). London. England: Sampson Low, Marston & Company, © 1898

External links 
 "Northumberland" National Heritage List for England

Ships of the line of the Royal Navy
Protected Wrecks of England
Maritime incidents in 1703
Ships built in Bristol
Shipwrecks in the Downs
1670s ships
1679 in England
1703 in England
History of Kent